Carole Bienaimé (also Carole Bienaimé-Besse), is a commissioner and board member of Conseil Supérieur de l'Audiovisuel, an independent agency of French government that regulates communications by radio, television, and internet platforms across France and all its territories. She was nominated by the president of the French Senate, Gérard Larcher, in 2017. Bienaimé-Besse used to be a television and cinema producer and a director. She used to be an executive at April Snow Films & Capital. Officier dans l'Ordre des Arts et des Lettres promoted by French Minister of Culture Roselyne Bachelot and Chevalier de l'Ordre National du Mérite French order of merit by President Emmanuel Macron, Bienaimé Besse was a board member of the fund Compte de Soutien de l'Industrie de Programmes Audiovisuels at Centre national du cinéma et de l'image animée. She was also vice-president of Producers Guild in France and a board member of French Producers Society.

Overview 
Bienaimé Besse has over 20 years of experience in the international entertainment industry and fundraising. Since 1998 she has been involved in many international productions. Since 2017 Bienaimé-Besse has been a commissioner and board member of Conseil Supérieur de l'Audiovisuel. She was designated by Gérard Larcher, the president of the French Senate, and then confirmed by the Education and Culture Commission of French Senate for a six-year term. 

Before that, since 2007, and besides her producer and chief information officer position in April Snow Films & Capital, Bienaimé-Besse served as board member of Compte de Soutien de l'Industrie de Programmes Audiovisuels Fund at the Centre National du Cinéma et de l'Image Animée – the French public organisation part of the French Ministry of Culture that invests in feature films and TV programmes. Renaud Donnedieu de Vabres, Minister of Culture at that time, named her to the board of the fund.

Producer, advisor for international productions and coproductions, and financing expert, she was invited in 2010 by the Financial Times, to be part, as speaker, of the FT Business of Film Summit in Doha, Qatar, with other producers such as Harvey Weinstein, Bill Mechanic, Jeremy Thomas, and Mark Gordon.

From February 2012 to January 2014 she was board member and vice president at the French Producers Guild. Since March 2012, she has been a regular columnist on Le Huffington Post (in association with Le Monde group). The editor-in-chief of the French version of The Huffington Post (Time Warner group) is managed by Anne Sinclair.

Previously in 2007 Bienaimé was managing director and Producer at Elemiah, the production company of Yamina Benguigui and Marc Ladreit de Lacharrière part of FIMALAC Group. In 2006 she became shareholder of B Pop LLP, the production company of Malcolm McLaren, the same year Fast Food Nation by Richard Linklater, a feature film based on the novel of Eric Schlosser, produced by Malcolm Maclaren and Jeremy Thomas was selected by Festival de Cannes to be part of the official competition. In 2004, she co-founded Productions Campagne Première, an international documentary films production company with Martin Meissonnier. In 2000 she was head of fundraising and communications for Jacques Attali's international financing institution, PlaNet Finance, for which she also served as active board member.

Bienaimé-Besse established her career in 1998 in the film industry working as a production manager at Productions Phares & Balises (Jean Labib & T. Celal) and with producer Marco Cherqui ("Un Prophète").

In July 2010 Bienaimé-Besse was decorated as Chevalier de l'Ordre des Arts & des Lettres a French cultural honor from the French Ministry of Culture for people of artistic or literary creation or for the contribution to the spread of arts and letters in France and the world. In 2020 she was promoted to Officer de l'Ordre des Arts et des Lettres, by Roselyne Bachelot, Minister Of Culture. In December 2019 President Emmanuel Macron, decorated her as Chevalier de l'Ordre National du Mérite (National Order of Merit).

Bienaimé-Besse has a master's degree in law and international relations and a master's of business administration degree in economics.

Filmography

Feature films 
2012: Heart of Blackness by Valérie Tong-Cuong and Isabelle Boni-Claverie with Danny Glover, based on the novel Où je Suis by Valérie Tong-Cuong published by Éditions Grasset & Fasquelle
2006 : special advisor of Malcolm McLaren producer of Fast Food Nation a film by Richard Linklater, based on the novel of Eric Schlosser. Official competition at Festival de Cannes.

Documentary films 
2013 : Abraham Lincoln, the roads to Freedom by Carole Bienaimé (France Télévisions)
2012 : Label & Life, a documentary TV series about creation with Jean-Charles de Castelbajac, Karl Lagerfeld, Jean-Paul Gaultier, etc. by David Carr-Brown, Carole Bienaimé and Alain Teulère (NRJ Group/ NRJ 12/ NRJ Paris)
2008 : The Real Joan of Arc by Martin Meissonnier (ARTE)
2007 : Henri Leclerc au Nom de L'Homme, by Rémi Lainé, Empreintes (France 5)
2007: Taking on Chanel by Bren Simson (Al Jazeera English)
2004 : On God's Right by Martin Meissonnier (Canal + and SBS Australia)
2000 : Fous d'Opéra by Elizabeth Aubert (Canal +)
2000 : All about E.U. ? / Mein Gott Europa by Nick Fraser and Ben Lewis (BBC and ARTE)
2000 : Have you seen Jesus? by Alix de Saint-André and Bernard Cazedepats (Canal+)
1999 : Histoires d'en Sortir by Didier Lannoy (ARTE and France 3)
1998 : Journey to the Far Right by Nick Fraser and Christian Poveda (BBC and ARTE)
1998 : Le Saint-Suaire by Didier Lannoy (France 3)
1998 : Édouard Boubat by Itaka Schlubach (Paris Première)
1998 : Fashion : passion, sex and rebellion by Jaci Judelson and Gideon Koppel (BBC and ARTE)

TV fictions 
2007 : Aïcha by Yamina Benguigui (France 2)

Music videos 
2000: 1,2,3 Soleils (Khaled/Rachid Taha/Faudel) by Don't Kent (Barclay)
1999: Rodolphe Burger / Unlimited marriage II  by Jacques Audiard (Chrysalis)
1999: Kenza, by Claude Santiago with Khaled (Barclay Polygram)
1999: Femi Kuti / Beng Beng Beng  by Yves Buclet (Barclay Polygram / Universal Music)
1999: Liberté de Circulation / GISTI / Les petits papiers  by Jacques Audiard (Naïve)
1998:  Alain Bashung / Sommes-nous by Jacques Audiard
1998:  Alain Bashung / La nuit je mens by Jacques Audiard, Best music video at Victoire de la musique in 1999 (Barclay Polygram)
1998 : Johnny Hallyday / Debout by Xavier Durringer (Mercury Records / Universal Music)

Honours and decorations 

 * Since December 2019 : Chevalier de l'Ordre National du Mérite by President Emmanuel Macron 3 December 2019 

 * Since July 2010 : Chevalier de l'Ordre des Arts et des Lettres by the Minister of Culture Frédéric Mitterrand 1 July 2010.

 * Since December 2020 : promoted Officier de l'Ordre des Arts et des Lettres by Minister of Culture Roselyne Bachelot 18 December 2020.

References and notes

External links 
 Board of COSIP fund at Centre national du cinéma et de l'image animée
 
 Financial Times Business of Film Summit
 April Snow Films & Capital

1973 births
Living people
French television producers
Women television producers
French film producers
French film directors
French television writers
French women screenwriters
Women television writers
French women film producers
French women film directors
Chief information officers